Phillipp Richard Schofield  is a medieval historian and a professor in Aberystwyth University's Department of History and Welsh History.

Career 
Schofield graduated from University College London in 1986, with a BA in ancient and medieval history. He then undertook a doctorate at Wadham College, Oxford, under the supervision of Barbara Harvey: his DPhil was awarded in 1992 for his thesis "Land, family and inheritance in a later medieval community: Birdbrook, 1292–1412". After spending a year working for a commercial law firm, Schofield returned to the University of Oxford to take up a research position at the Wellcome Unit for the History of Medicine in 1993. Three years later, he took up a post in the Cambridge Group for the History of Population and Social Structure at the University of Cambridge, before joining Aberystwyth University in 1998. As of 2018, he is a Professor in the Department of History and Welsh History; he is currently Head of that Department. He understands and speaks Welsh. Since 2011, he has been co-editor of the Economic History Review, a scholarly journal. Schofield's research focuses on the English medieval rural economy and society.

Honours 
In 2016, Schofield was elected a Fellow of the Academy of Social Sciences. He is also a Fellow of the Royal Historical Society as of 2018.

Selected works 
 Peasants and Historians: Debating the Medieval English Peasantry, Manchester Medieval Studies series (Manchester University Press, 2016).
 (Co-edited with Elizabeth New, Susan Johns and John McEwan) Seals and Society: Medieval Wales, the Welsh Marches and Their English Border Counties  (University of Wales Press, 2016).
 (Co-edited with Maryanne Kowaleski and John Langdon) Peasants and Lords in the Medieval English Economy: Essays in Honour of Bruce M. S. Campbell (Brepols, 2015).
 (Edited) Seals and their Context in the Middle Ages (Oxbow Books, 2014).
 (Co-edited with Gérard Béaur, Jean-Michel Chevet and María Teresa Piréz Picazo) Property Rights, Land Markets and Economic Growth in the European Countryside (Brepols, 2013).
 (Co-edited with R. A. Griffiths) Wales and the Welsh in the Middle Ages: Essays Presented to J. Beverley Smith (University of Wales Press, 2011)
 (Co-edited with Thijs Lambrecht) Credit and the Rural Economy in North-Western Europe, c. 1200–c. 1850 (Brepols, 2009).
 (Co-edited with Bas J. P. van Bavel) The Development of Leasehold in Northwestern Europe, c. 1200–1600 (Brepols, 2009).
 (Co-edited with Peter Lambert) Making History: An Introduction to the History and Practices of a Discipline (Taylor & Francis, 2004).
 Peasant and Community in Medieval England, 1200–1500 (Palgrave Macmillan, 2003).
 (Co-authored with Nicholas Mayhew) Credit and Debt in Medieval England, c. 1180–c. 1350 (Oxbow Books, 2002).

References 

Living people
Medievalists
Alumni of University College London
Alumni of Wadham College, Oxford
Academics of the University of Oxford
Academics of the University of Cambridge
Academics of Aberystwyth University
Fellows of the Royal Historical Society
Fellows of the Academy of Social Sciences
Year of birth missing (living people)